Santaldih Thermal Power Station of West Bengal Power Development Corporation Limited is a power station with an installed capacity of 500 MW (2x250 MW).

Location
It is located on the Adra-Gomoh branch line of South-Eastern Railway, on the southern bank of Damodar River. There is a railway station at Santaldih on the Adra-Gomoh branch line.

Capacity
The installed capacity of Santaldih Thermal Power Station is 2 x 250 MW. The four units were commissioned as follows- Unit 1: 1.1.1974; Unit 2: 16.7.1975; Unit 3: 6.12.1978; Unit 4: 30.3.1981.
STPS has expanded capacity by 2 x 250 MW . The previous units (1,2,3,4) are non functional now and they are demolished. Unit 5 & 6 are operating now both are 250 MW. Unit 7 & 8 are proposed to be installed in future. Unit 7 & 8 will be super critical of 800 MW each.

References

x

Purulia district
Coal-fired power stations in West Bengal
1974 establishments in West Bengal
Energy infrastructure completed in 1974